Joe Craig McMurtry (born November 5, 1959) is an American former Major League Baseball pitcher for the Atlanta Braves (1983–86), Texas Rangers (1988–90) and Houston Astros (1995).

He was named the athletic director at Temple College in 2013.

Career

In 1982, McMurtry was Pitcher of the Year for the International League's Richmond Braves. In 1983, he finished seventh in voting for the National League Cy Young Award and second in voting for National League Rookie of the Year, to Darryl Strawberry, for having a 15–9 record with a 3.08 ERA in 36 games, 35 of them started. He also completed six games and shutout three.

In eight seasons, he had a 28–42 win–loss record, 212 games, 79 games started, six complete games, three shutouts, 36 games finished, four saves,  innings pitched, 650 hits allowed, 341 runs allowed, 303 earned runs allowed, 54 home runs allowed, 336 walks allowed, 349 strikeouts, 10 hit batsmen, 18 wild pitches, 2,921 batters faced, 17 intentional walks, eight balks and a 4.08 ERA.

On June 4, 1986, McMurtry gave up Barry Bonds's first career home run. Looking back on the play twenty years later he said "It was a fastball, down and away. He took it the other way. I don't know how he hit it."

On February 2, 1987, McMurtry was traded by the Braves to the Toronto Blue Jays for Damaso Garcia and Luis Leal. However, McMurtry never played a game for the Blue Jays. Also, Leal never played for the Braves, while Garcia played only 21 games for them, batting .117 before being released.

After the conclusion of his playing career, McMurtry coached the baseball team at Temple College.

References

External links
, or Retrosheet

1959 births
Living people
American expatriate baseball players in Mexico
Atlanta Braves players
Baseball players from Texas
Diablos Rojos del México players
Greenville Braves players
Gulf Coast Rangers players
Houston Astros players
Knoxville Blue Jays players
Major League Baseball pitchers
McLennan Highlanders baseball players
Mexican League baseball pitchers
Oklahoma City 89ers players
People from Bell County, Texas
Phoenix Firebirds players
Richmond Braves players
Savannah Braves players
Syracuse Chiefs players
Texas Rangers players
Tiburones de La Guaira players
American expatriate baseball players in Venezuela
Tucson Toros players
Temple Leopards coaches
Junior college baseball coaches in the United States
Junior college athletic directors in the United States
Minor league baseball coaches